Pollard's p − 1 algorithm is a number theoretic integer factorization algorithm, invented by John Pollard in 1974. It is a special-purpose algorithm, meaning that it is only suitable for integers with specific types of factors; it is the simplest example of an algebraic-group factorisation algorithm.

The factors it finds are ones for which the number preceding the factor, p − 1, is powersmooth; the essential observation is that, by working in the multiplicative group modulo a composite number N, we are also working in the multiplicative groups modulo all of Ns factors.

The existence of this algorithm leads to the concept of safe primes, being primes for which p − 1 is two times a Sophie Germain prime q and thus minimally smooth.  These primes are sometimes construed as "safe for cryptographic purposes", but they might be unsafe — in current recommendations for cryptographic strong primes (e.g. ANSI X9.31), it is necessary but not sufficient that p − 1 has at least one large prime factor.  Most sufficiently large primes are strong; if a prime used for cryptographic purposes turns out to be non-strong, it is much more likely to be through malice than through an accident of random number generation.  This terminology is considered obsolete by the cryptography industry: ECM makes safe primes just as easy to factor as non-safe primes, so size is the important factor.

Base concepts
Let n be a composite integer with prime factor p.  By Fermat's little theorem, we know that for all integers a coprime to p and for all positive integers K:

If a number x is congruent to 1 modulo a factor of n, then the  will be divisible by that factor.

Check at each stage, or once at the end if you prefer, whether  is not equal to 1.

Multiple factors

It is possible that for all the prime factors p of n, p − 1 is divisible by small primes, at which point the Pollard p − 1 algorithm gives you n again.

Algorithm and running time
The basic algorithm can be written as follows:Inputs: n: a composite numberOutput''': a nontrivial factor of n or failure

 select a smoothness bound B define  (note: explicitly evaluating M may not be necessary)
 randomly pick a coprime to n (note: we can actually fix a, e.g. if n is odd, then we can always select a = 2, random selection here is not imperative)
 compute  (note: exponentiation can be done modulo n)
 if  then return g if  then select a larger B and go to step 2 or return failure
 if  then select a smaller B and go to step 2 or return failure

If  in step 6, this indicates there are no prime factors p for which p-1 is B-powersmooth.  If  in step 7, this usually indicates that all factors were B-powersmooth, but in rare cases it could indicate that a had a small order modulo n. Additionally, when the maximum prime factors of p-1 for each prime factors p of n are all the same in some rare cases, this algorithm will fail.

 Example 

If we want to factor the number n = 299.
 We select B = 5.
 Thus M = 22 × 31 × 51.
 We select a = 2.
 g = gcd(aM − 1, n) = 13.
 Since 1 < 13 < 299, thus return 13.
 299 / 13 = 23 is prime, thus it is fully factored: 299 = 13 × 23.

How to choose B?

Since the algorithm is incremental, it can just keep running with the bound constantly increasing.

Assume that p − 1, where p is the smallest prime factor of n, can be modelled as a random number of size less than . By Dixon's theorem, the probability that the largest factor of such a number is less than (p − 1)1/ε is roughly ε−ε; so there is a probability of about 3−3 = 1/27 that a B value of n1/6 will yield a factorisation.

In practice, the elliptic curve method is faster than the Pollard p − 1 method once the factors are at all large; running the p − 1 method up to B = 232 will find a quarter of all 64-bit factors and 1/27 of all 96-bit factors.

Two-stage variant
After completing the first stage, which is the same as the basic algorithm, instead of computing a new

for B2 and checking {{nowrap|gcd(a<sup>M'</sup> − 1, n)}}, we compute

where  and check if  produces a nontrivial factor of n. As before, exponentiations can be done modulo n.

Let {q1, q2, …} be successive prime numbers in the interval  and dn = qn − qn−1 the difference between consecutive prime numbers. Since typically ,  are even numbers. The distribution of prime numbers is such that the dn will all be relatively small. It is suggested that .

Implementations

 The GMP-ECM package includes an efficient implementation of the p'' − 1 method.
 Prime95 and MPrime, the official clients of the Great Internet Mersenne Prime Search, use a modified version of the p - 1 algorithm to eliminate potential candidates.

See also
 Williams's p + 1 algorithm

References

 

Integer factorization algorithms